Lee Creek is a  river in Arkansas and Oklahoma which starts near West Fork in Washington County, Arkansas, and flows south to the Arkansas River passing through Crawford County, Arkansas, and Sequoyah County, Oklahoma. Lee Creek flows from Arkansas into Oklahoma, then returns to Arkansas before its confluence with the Arkansas River near Van Buren and Fort Smith.

Lee Creek is also known as Lee's Creek, mostly in Oklahoma where it is classified by the State of Oklahoma as a State Scenic River. In Arkansas upstream of the Oklahoma border, Lee Creek is classified by the State of Arkansas as an Extraordinary Resource Waterway.

Crossings
 Lee Creek Bridge (Natural Dam, Arkansas)
 Lee Creek Bridge (Van Buren, Arkansas)

See also
Butterfield Overland Mail Route Lee Creek Road Segment
List of rivers of Arkansas

References

External links
Southwest Paddler - Lee Creek, Arkansas
Oklahoma Digital Maps: Digital Collections of Oklahoma and Indian Territory

Rivers of Arkansas
Tributaries of the Arkansas River
Rivers of Washington County, Arkansas
Rivers of Crawford County, Arkansas
Rivers of Oklahoma